The 1981 Chicago White Sox season was the White Sox's 81st season in the major leagues, and their 82nd season overall. They finished with a record of 54-52, good enough for 3rd place in the American League West, 8.5 games behind the 1st place Oakland Athletics. However, due to a player's strike, the Athletics would play the 50-53 Kansas City Royals, who had finished behind the White Sox.

Owner Bill Veeck attempted to sell the club to Ed DeBartolo, but the offer was turned down by the other owners. Veeck was then forced to sell to a different investment group headed by Jerry Reinsdorf and Eddie Einhorn.

Offseason 
 October 6, 1980: Minnie Miñoso was released by the White Sox.
 November 26, 1980: Ron LeFlore was signed as a free agent by the White Sox.
 March 18, 1981: Carlton Fisk was signed as a free agent by the White Sox.
 March 28, 1981: Ken Kravec was traded by the White Sox to the Chicago Cubs for Dennis Lamp.
 March 30, 1981: Greg Luzinski purchased from Philadelphia Phillies

Regular season

Season standings

Record vs. opponents

Opening Day lineup 
 Ron LeFlore, LF
 Mike Squires, 1B
 Carlton Fisk, C
 Greg Luzinski, DH
 Chet Lemon, CF
 Harold Baines, RF
 Jim Morrison, 3B
 Tony Bernazard, 2B
 Bill Almon, SS
 Britt Burns, P

Notable transactions 
 April 1, 1981: Thad Bosley was traded by the White Sox to the Milwaukee Brewers for John Poff.
 July 18, 1981: George Riley was signed as a free agent by the White Sox.
 August 30, 1981: Ivan Mesa (minors), Ronnie Perry (minors), a player to be named later, and cash were traded by the White Sox to the Minnesota Twins for Jerry Koosman. The White Sox completed the deal by sending Randy Johnson to the Twins on September 2.

Roster

Player stats

Batting 
Note: G = Games played; AB = At bats; R = Runs scored; H = Hits; 2B = Doubles; 3B = Triples; HR = Home runs; RBI = Runs batted in; BB = Base on balls; SO = Strikeouts; AVG = Batting average; SB = Stolen bases

Pitching 
Note: W = Wins; L = Losses; ERA = Earned run average; G = Games pitched; GS = Games started; SV = Saves; IP = Innings pitched; H = Hits allowed; R = Runs allowed; ER = Earned runs allowed; HR = Home runs allowed; BB = Walks allowed; K = Strikeouts

Farm system

Notes

References 

 1981 Chicago White Sox at Baseball Reference

Chicago White Sox seasons
Chicago White Sox season
Chicago